Radial Road 3 (R-3), informally known as the R-3 Road, is a network of roads and bridges that all together form the third arterial road of Metro Manila in the Philippines.

Route description

Osmeña Highway 

Between its northern terminus at the intersection with Quirino Avenue in Paco district and Sales Interchange at the boundary of Pasay and Taguig, R-3 is known as Osmeña Highway. It used to be known as South Superhighway which is the toll-free component of South Luzon Expressway in Metro Manila, named after Commonwealth president Sergio Osmeña. It links Paco and San Andres south to Magallanes Interchange in Makati. The name also refers to the expressway segment south of Magallanes Interchange up to Kilometer 28.387 in San Pedro, Laguna.

South Luzon Expressway 

The main segment of R-3 is the South Luzon Expressway (SLEX) which runs underneath Skyway up to Muntinlupa in Metro Manila and forms a component of the Pan-Philippine Highway (AH26). With the expressway section starting at Magallanes Interchange and its 
restrictions starting at Sales Interchange, it traverses the Metro Manila cities of Makati, Taguig, Pasay, Parañaque, and Muntinlupa and the Laguna cities of San Pedro, Biñan, the Cavite municipality of Carmona, and the Laguna cities of Santa Rosa, Cabuyao, and Calamba before arriving at the Southern Tagalog Arterial Road in the city of Santo Tomas in Batangas.

Southern Tagalog Arterial Road 

R-3 is known as the Southern Tagalog Arterial Road (STAR Tollway) in the province of Batangas, which connects the South Luzon Expressway with the Port of Batangas in Batangas City.

Notes

References 

Routes in Metro Manila